Pletholax (Keeled Legless Lizard) is a legless lizard occurring in Western Australia.

Species
Two species are recognized as being valid.
Pletholax gracilis  - slender slider 
Pletholax edelensis  - Edel land slider

Nota bene: A binomial authority or a trinomial authority in parentheses indicates that the species or subspecies was originally described in a genus other than Pletholax.

References

Further reading
Boulenger GA (1885). Catalogue of the Lizards in the British Museum (Natural History). Second Edition. Volume I. ... Pygopodidæ ... London: Trustees of the British Museum (Natural History). (Taylor and Francis, printers). xii + 436 pp. + Plates I-XXXII. (Pletholax gracilis, new combination, p. 245).
Cope ED (1864). "On the Characters of the higher Groups of REPTILIA SQUAMATA—and especially of the DIPLOGLOSSA". Proc. Acad. Nat. Sci. Philadelphia 1864: 224–231. (Pletholax, new genus, p. 229; Pygopus gracilis, new species, p. 229).

 
Legless lizards
Taxa named by Edward Drinker Cope
Pygopodids of Australia